Adele Rova (born 2 May 1996) is a Fijian swimmer. She competed at the 2009 World Aquatics Championships (50 metre backstroke, 100 metre breaststroke, 50 metre breaststroke, 50 metre butterfly, 100 metre butterfly, 50 metre freestyle). She won silver with her team at the 2011 Pacific Games in the 4×100 metres freestyle relay event.

She is a sister of Cheyenne Rova.

See also
 List of Fijian records in swimming

References

1996 births
Living people
Fijian female swimmers
Place of birth missing (living people)
20th-century Fijian women
21st-century Fijian women